Holmes Glacier is a broad glacier debouching into the western part of Porpoise Bay about  south of Cape Spieden. It was delineated from aerial photographs taken by U.S. Navy Operation Highjump (1946–47), and was named by the Advisory Committee on Antarctic Names after Dr. Silas Holmes, Assistant Surgeon on the brig Porpoise during the United States Exploring Expedition (1838–42) under Lieutenant Charles Wilkes.

See also
 List of glaciers in the Antarctic
 Glaciology

References

 

Glaciers of Wilkes Land